Flax bibrevipennis is a moth of the family Erebidae first described by Michael Fibiger in 2011. It is found on Borneo (it was described from Sarawak).

The wingspan is 9-9.5 mm. The forewings have a costa which is shorter than the posterior margin. The ground colour is light grey brown, including the fringes. The base of the costa is dark brown. There is a dark-brown quadrangular patch in the upper medial area, with a black dot in the inner lower area. The crosslines are brown, except for the terminal line, which is indicated by dark-brown interveinal dots. The hindwings are grey. The underside of the forewings is unicolorous brown and the underside of the hindwings is grey with a discal spot.

References

Micronoctuini
Moths described in 2011
Taxa named by Michael Fibiger